Spook is a synonym for ghost. Spook or spooks may also refer to:

People
 Spook (nickname), shared by several notable people
 Per Spook (born 1939), Norwegian fashion designer
 a ghostwriter
 a racial slur referring to a black person
 an undercover agent or spy

Places
 Spook Bridge, an abandoned bridge over the Withlacoochee River, Georgia, United States
 Spook Cave, a flooded cave in Iowa, US
 Spook Hill, a gravity hill in Florida, US
 Spook (crater), a small crater in the Descartes Highlands of the Moon

Arts, entertainment, media

Fictional characters
 Spook (comics), a DC Comics enemy of Batman
 Spook, a character from the cartoon series Top Cat
 Spook, a character in the comic strip The Wizard of Id

Films
 Spooks (1930 film), a 1930 Oswald the Lucky Rabbit short
 Spooks (1953 film), a 1953 Three Stooges short
 Spooks: The Greater Good, a British 2015 spy film

Literature and comics
 Spook: Science Tackles the Afterlife, a 2005 non-fiction book by Mary Roach
 Spook's, a series of dark fantasy novels by Joseph Delaney
 Spook, a graphic novel by Joshua Starnes and Lisandro Estherren
 Spooks, a children's book by Colin and Jacqui Hawkins as part of their Picture Lions series
 Spooks, a comic book series by Larry Hama

Television
 Spooks (TV series), a UK series broadcast from 2002 to 2011 (called MI-5 in some countries)
 Spooks: Code 9, a UK series broadcast in 2008

Music

Groups
 Spooks (group), an American hip-hop band

Albums
 Spooks (album), a 2010 album by The Beautiful Girls
 Spooks: Original Comics Soundtrack, a 2008 album by Lalo Schifrin and Andy Garfield, based on the comics by Larry Hama

Songs
 "Spooks", by Dance Gavin Dance from the album Downtown Battle Mountain II
 "Spooks", by Jonny Greenwood (Radiohead) from the Inherent Vice soundtrack
 "Spooks!", by Louis Armstrong, released in 1954, later found on album Satchmo In Style
"Spooks", by Marion Brown from the album Three for Shepp 1966
 "Spooks", by Pryda from the single Spooks / Do It
 "Spook", by Black Rebel Motorcycle Club from the album Wrong Creatures

Other arts, entertainment, and media
 Spooks (video game), a 1985 video game

Military
 "Spook", nickname for a Mine Protected Combat Vehicle, a Rhodesian armoured fighting vehicle 
 "The Spook", emblem of the McDonnell Douglas F-4 Phantom II, a United States Navy fighter-bomber

Other uses
 a concept in the philosophy of Max Stirner

See also
 Spooked (disambiguation)
 Spooky (disambiguation)
 Secret agent (disambiguation)